Chremistica tagalica is a cicada found in the Malay archipelago and the Philippines. First described in A Monograph of Oriental Cicadas, it was formerly known as Cicada tagalica. It is "pale olive" in color, with a "broad band" atop its head.

References 

Arthropods of Asia
Insects described in 1870